The Golden Bell Award for Best Miniseries or Television Film is presented annually by the Government Information Office, Taiwan. The first time that the television programs were first eligible to be awarded was in 1971. In 2017, the category was split into two separate categories, Best Miniseries, and Best Television Film with a winner selected from each category.

Winners and nominees
TV Series program winners from 1971 to 1982 were not included in the list. For more information, see also: Golden Bell Awards list of winners

1980s

1990s

2000s

2010s

2020s

Notes

References

Mini-series, Best